Population Health Metrics (PHM) is a BioMed Central "open access, peer-reviewed, online journal featuring innovative research that addresses all aspects of the measurement of population health, including concepts, methods, ethics, and results." PHM is one of the few journals that focuses on population health and all of its sub-disciplines. The journal is edited by co-editors-in-chief, Christopher J.L. Murray and Alan D. Lopez and is further supported by a 25-person expert Editorial Board. The journal "is tracked by Thomson Reuters (ISI) and has a 2014 Impact Factor of 3.347.

External links
http://www.pophealthmetrics.com/
http://www.springer.com/public+health/journal/12963
http://endnote.com/downloads/style/population-health-metrics
http://www.researchgate.net/journal/1478-7954_Population_Health_Metrics
http://www.scimagojr.com/journalsearch.php?q=22494&tip=sid

BioMed Central academic journals
Public health journals
Publications established in 2003
Demography journals